Oceanospirillaceae is a family of Pseudomonadota. Most genera in this family live in environments with high concentrations of salt; they are halotolerant or halophilic. They are marine, except Balneatrix which is found in fresh water.All members are strictly aerobic, except Neptunomonas which can perform   fermentation reactions.

References

External links
 Family Oceanospirillaceae - J.P. Euzéby: List of Prokaryotic names with Standing in Nomenclature

Oceanospirillales